Severe Tropical Cyclone Gita was the most intense tropical cyclone to impact Tonga since reliable records began. The second named storm and first major tropical cyclone of the 2017–18 South Pacific cyclone season, Gita originated from a monsoon trough that was active in the South Pacific in early February 2018. First classified as a tropical disturbance on 3 February, the nascent system meandered near Vanuatu for several days with little development. After acquiring a steady east trajectory near Fiji, it organized into a Category 1 tropical cyclone on 9 February near Samoa. Arcing south in a clockwise turn, the system rapidly intensified, and became a severe tropical cyclone on 10 February near Niue.

Throughout its path in the South Pacific, Cyclone Gita affected multiple island nations and territories. Tonga was the hardest-hit, with severe damage occurring on the islands of Tongatapu and ʻEua; two fatalities and forty-one injuries occurred in the kingdom. At least 171 homes were destroyed and more than 1,100 suffered damage. Violent winds destroyed homes and left the two islands largely without power. Torrential rains and damaging winds caused widespread disruptions in Samoa and American Samoa, prompting emergency declarations in both. Outlying islands in the Fijian Lau Islands were significantly affected, particularly Ono-i-Lau and Vatoa. Wallis and Futuna, Niue, and Vanuatu were also affected, but impacts in those areas were minor. Total damage from Gita is estimated to be in excess of US$252 million, primarily in American Samoa and Tonga.

Meteorological history

The system was poorly organized and was located along an upper-level ridge of high pressure, in an area of high vertical wind shear. Over the next couple of days, the system moved erratically near northern Vanuatu and remained poorly organized, with convection located to the south of the low-level circulation center. The system subsequently started to move south-eastwards, towards the Fijian Islands and a favorable environment for further development, on 5 February. The system subsequently passed near the island nation during 8 February, where it developed into a tropical depression and started to move north-eastwards towards the Samoan Islands. The FMS subsequently named the system Tropical Cyclone Gita early, after the United States National Weather Service Weather Forecast Office in Pago Pago requested that the system be named early for warning and humanitarian reasons.

After Gita was named, a prolonged period of rapid intensification ensued as it quickly intensified into a Category 1 tropical cyclone on the Australian tropical cyclone intensity scale, before it passed within  of Samoa and American Samoa. After moving past the Samoan Islands, Gita turned southeast, then southwards, under the influence of a near-equatorial ridge to the northeast. The system bypassed Niue to the east during this intensification phase. On 11 February, Gita continued to intensify into a category 4 severe tropical cyclone. At the same time, Gita turned westward under the influence of a subtropical ridge to the south. Around 12:00 UTC on 12 February, the cyclone passed near or over the Tongan islands of ʻEua and Tongatapu as a high-end Category 4 severe tropical cyclone. At this time, maximum 10-minute sustained winds were estimated at  making Gita the strongest cyclone to strike the nation since reliable records began.

Impact

Gita impacted the Pacific island nations and territories of Vanuatu, Fiji, Wallis and Futuna, Samoa, American Samoa, Cook Islands, Niue, Tonga, New Caledonia, and New Zealand, with the most significant damage being reported in the Samoan Islands and Tonga. Owing to the cyclone's significant and widespread impact, the name Gita was retired following its usage and will never be used for a South Pacific tropical cyclone again.

Samoa

Gita brought torrential rain to parts of Samoa on 8–9 February. Multiple rivers in the city burst their banks and inundated homes. At least 233 people sought refuge in emergency shelters. Landslides and flooding rendered many roads impassable. Communications were briefly lost with the southern coast of Upolu. A state of disaster was declared for the nation on 10 February. Damage to the power grid reached $10 million. No casualties were reported nationwide.

American Samoa

On 8 February, the National Weather Service (NWS) office in Pago Pago issued a tropical storm watch, a high surf advisory, and a flash flood watch for all of American Samoa as the nascent cyclone approached the territory. With Tropical Depression 08F existing simultaneously to the south of Fiji, uncertainty existed in the exact track of Gita. However, NWS Forecasters emphasized the risk of flash floods and mudslides as the interaction of two cyclones led to persistent monsoonal flow across the region. In the two days preceding Gita's arrival, this monsoon trough produced significant rains, reaching . Monsoonal rains continued for two days after Cyclone Gita, and the flash flood watch was finally discontinued on 12 February. The American Samoa Emergency Management Agency advised residents to "remain on alert and secure loose items as necessary". The tropical storm watch was soon upgraded to a warning, indicating the expected arrival of gale-force winds within 36 hours. Pago Pago International Airport suspended operations for the duration of the storm. The NWS discontinued the tropical storm warning late on 9 February as Gita moved away from the territory.

Cyclone Gita reached American Samoa on 9 February, bringing heavy rains and strong winds from 4:00 a.m. to 2:00 p.m. local time. These winds tore roofs of structures and downed trees and power lines across the territory, with the most severe damage reported in Nu'uuli and Tafuna. Approximately 90 percent of the island was left without power and water and nearly 1,000 people required evacuation. The NWS Office lost power; the Honolulu, Hawaii, office issued forecasts in the interim. Rainfall in Pago Pago exceeded . Flash floods and mudslides occurred territory-wide, with valleys and low-lying areas being most affected. Multiple streams flooded and prompted evacuations in Malaeloa village. Landslides were reported in Avau, Amanave, and Poloa. Approximately 3,000 people reported damage to their crops. Destruction of banana, papaya, and breadfruit crops temporarily limited the availability of food. At the American Samoa National Park, every trail closed.

Offshore, the cargo ship Uila o le Sami sank near Taʻū during the storm. The vessel was previously adrift in international waters following a fire on 4 November 2017. The grounding of the Chui Kai Fa No. 1 prompted the closure of the port of Pago Pago until 11 February. The vessel contained an estimated  of diesel fuel and a light oil sheen was reported in the area. Inclement weather produced by Cyclone Gita impeded response efforts by the United States Coast Guard.

An assessment by the American Samoa Public Works in March 2018 determined that Cyclone Gita destroyed 387 homes, inflicted major damage to more than 1,300 homes, and damaged a further 1,600. The American Samoa Department of Commerce estimated that half of the territory's population suffered some form of property loss and placed total damage at US$200 million. A 2019 report by the American Samoa Economic Forecast calculated combined direct and indirect losses at US$186 million. The National Centers for Environmental Information calculated a lower damage total of US$52 million. In contrast to the scale of damage, no fatalities or injuries were reported.

On 10 February, a Coast Guard AC-130 conducted aerial surveys of the territory and a small group of Federal Emergency Management Agency (FEMA) personnel were deployed. By 18 April, almost 100 federal personnel were deployed to the territory.  United States President Donald Trump declared a state of emergency for American Samoa on 11 February. The United States Army Reserve assisted FEMA and the American Red Cross with the deployment of personnel and distribution of relief supplies. Furthermore, the Army Reserve Pago Pago facility was converted into a staging area for the disaster response. The United Nations Development Programme initiated a US$100,000 response plan on 16 February to support the local governmental response. President Trump later declared the territory a major disaster area on 2 March. Following this declaration, the Internal Revenue Service announced that residents could apply for tax exemptions. Health officials advised residents to boil water amid an enhanced risk of dengue fever. StarKist Samoa donated US$50,000 to the American Samoa Government on 16 March. On 9 April 2019, Representative Nita Lowey (D-NY) introduced the Additional Supplemental Appropriations for Disaster Relief Act, 2019 bill to the 116th Congress. The bill, signed into law by President Trump on 6 June, provided just over US$17.2 billion for disaster recovery nationwide; of this US$18 million was allocated for American Samoa and made available through February 2020. However, distribution of these funds was delayed and Governor Lolo Matalasi Moliga urged the United States Department of Agriculture to expedite the process. Through March 2021, FEMA provided US$31,198,512.50 in financial assistance: $20,543,787.44 in individual funds, US$9,763,391.26 for public assistance, and US$891,333.80 for a hazard mitigation program. A further US$40 million was provided through the Small Business Administration, intergovernmental agreements, disaster grants, and private distributions.

A prolonged downturn in the territory's tuna industry in the decade preceding Gita led to an economic recession. The nationwide reconstruction efforts and the influx of money in the wake of the cyclone spurred slight growth of the American Samoa economy, reflecting in the gross domestic product increasing by 2.2 percent in 2018, and a pause in the recession. This economic stimulation quickly subsided and American Samoa's economy contracted in 2019.

Tonga

Prior to and during the cyclone, approximately 5,700 residents sought refuge in public shelters. Power was turned off prior to the storm's arrival. Striking Tonga on 12 February, Cyclone Gita brought destructive winds to the capital island of Tongatapu. Initial surveys across the island revealed 119 homes destroyed and another 1,131 damaged, primarily in Nukuʻalofa. Many areas were left without water and power. Many structures lost their roof during the height of the storm. Older structures suffered the greatest damage, including the Tongan Parliament building, built more than 100 years ago, which was flattened by the storm. Fuaʻamotu International Airport sustained damage, along with the domestic terminal, prompting officials to keep the airport closed. Across Tongatapu, 3 people suffered major injuries while another 30 experienced minor injuries. An elderly woman died while trying to find shelter after her home was destroyed. One person died from a heart attack potentially related to the storm in Fuaʻamotu.

On the neighboring island of ʻEua, the storm knocked out power to all residents and caused extensive damage. Similar to Tongatapu, older structures suffered severe damage while newer buildings fared well. Crops were largely destroyed. Fifty-two homes were completely destroyed on the island; eight people suffered injury, including one severe. Total damage were estimated at T$356.1 million (US$164.1 million), including a NZ$20 million (US$14.5 million) damage to the power grid.

Immediately following the storm, a curfew was imposed for all of Tonga. Personnel from His Majesty's Armed Forces rescued people during the storm and began clearing roads at daybreak on 13 February. National Emergency Management Office spokesman Graham Kenna called the storm "the worst situation [he has] been in" during his 30-year career. MP Lord Fusituʻa described the impact as the worst since at least Cyclone Isaac in 1982. India provided US$500,000 humanitarian aid to Tonga under UNOSSF. On 13 February, Australia provided A$350,000 (US$275,000) in emergency supplies via the Royal Australian Air Force (RAAF) to assist more than 2,000 people. Australia also sent humanitarian supplies to the Tongan Red Cross. Two civilian humanitarian specialists were deployed to assist Tonga's National Emergency Management Office. A medical expert also provided assistance to assess health infrastructure. New Zealand provided NZ$750,000 (US$544,000) in assistance.

Fiji
During Gita's formative states on 6–8 February, the depression brought heavy rain and gusty winds to northern Fiji resulting in some flooding. Accordingly, the FMS issued alerts for these hazards across the affected regions. Rainfall reached  in Udu Point on 6 February.

Flooding from tidal surge preceded the core of the cyclone by several hours. Structural damage was reported in Doi Village, including one home that lost its roof. Communications with Ono-i-Lai and nearby Vatoa were disrupted for roughly a day. Across both islands, 10 homes were destroyed and 26 more sustained damage. Many structures sustained roof damage and crops were devastated. Local leaders on Ono-i-Lau called the storm the "worst in living memory". Damage to the nation were at FJ$1.23 million (US$606,000).

New Caledonia
On 16 February, the New Caledonia branch of Météo-France issued a level 1 hurricane alert for the Isle of Pines, southeast Grande Terre. This was soon raised to level 2, prompting the closure of schools and businesses across the municipality. In advance of the storm, most tourists visiting Isle of Pines were evacuated to Nouméa; however, many stayed to ride out the storm. Municipal buildings were opened to the public as shelters. Domestic flights at Nouméa Magenta Airport were suspended during the storm's passage. The two broken halves of the ship were ballasted to minimize movement in the expected rough seas. The cyclone ultimately had little effect across the territory; some damage to vegetation and marinas was reported.

Australia

Conditions remained hazardous through 19 February. Surf Life Saving Queensland closed all beaches between North Kirra and Southport. Although most people heeded warnings and closures, some "thrillseekers" surfed and used jet skis. One person required rescue in the Jumpinpin Channel. A surfer and swimmer were pulled from dangerous rip currents at Burleigh and Mooloolaba, respectively. Off Nambucca Heads, New South Wales, one person was pulled out to sea by rip currents on 17 February. Surf Life Saving New South Wales stated that rescue operations shifted to recovery the following day as there had been "a significant amount of time since this gentleman disappeared". Helicopters conducted aerial surveys on 19 February to assist local police and rescuers. Search and rescue operations were ultimately suspended on 21 February without success. Two people were rescued off the coast of Manly when their boat sank amid  swells. Throughout New South Wales, authorities conducted dozens of rescues.

New Zealand

As Cyclone Gita threatened to hit New Zealand as a strong ex-tropical cyclone, New Zealand's MetService issued heavy rain warnings and strong wind warnings covering a wide expanse of the country. Campers, hikers, and boaters in the Marlborough Sounds were told to evacuate, and residents there were warned that communications could be cut off by the storm. Several schools in the region of Nelson were closed, while in the West Coast, schools in the districts of Buller and Grey were closed. Air New Zealand cancelled a number of flights on 20 February.

As Gita bore down on the South Island, bringing floods and strong winds, a state of emergency was eventually declared on 20 February. Total insured losses across New Zealand reached NZ$35.6 million (US$26.1 million). In Taranaki, Gita resulted in NZ$4.5 million (US$3.1 million) worth of damage. A tree fell on a water main near the water treatment plant south of New Plymouth, leaving 10,000 homes without water for 3 days and 26,000 homes on a boil water notice for 7 days.

Other nations
As Gita's precursor tropical disturbance impacted Vanuatu's Torba province during 6 February, the Vanuatu Meteorology and Geo-hazards Department warned that heavy rainfall, thunder and lightning would impact the area and advised people to take extra precautions. Additional alerts were raised on 15–16 February as Gita tracked southeast of the nation. Between 8 and 9 February, the system brought strong winds and heavy rain to Wallis and Futuna. Some power outages were reported on Wallis, though overall effects were negligible. On 8 February, weather alerts were issued for Niue as Gita approached from the northeast. The cyclone bypassed the island to the southeast the following day with minimal effects.

See also

Weather of 2017 and 2018
Tropical cyclones in 2017 and 2018
Cyclone Ofa
Cyclone Hina
Cyclone Waka
Cyclone Heta
Cyclone Ian
Cyclone Winston

Notes

References

External links

2017–18 South Pacific cyclone season
Category 5 South Pacific cyclones
February 2018 events in Oceania
Tropical cyclones in American Samoa
Tropical cyclones in Samoa
Tropical cyclones in Tonga
Tropical cyclones in Vanuatu
Tropical cyclones in Fiji
Tropical cyclones in Niue
Tropical cyclones in Wallis and Futuna
2018 in American Samoa
2018 in Samoa
2018 in Niue
2018 in Tonga
2018 in Vanuatu
2018 in Fiji
2018 in Wallis and Futuna
2018 in New Zealand
Tropical cyclones in New Caledonia
2018 in New Caledonia
Tropical cyclones in New Zealand
Gita
Floods in New Zealand